The Men's 4 × 100 m relay T35-38 for athletes with cerebral palsy at the 2004 Summer Paralympics was held in the Athens Olympic Stadium on 23 September. The event consisted of a single race, and was won by the team representing .

Final round

23 Sept. 2004, 12:05

Team Lists

References

M